Darinko Kosor (b. 14 March 1965) is a Croatian politician and a former leader of the Croatian Social Liberal Party (HSLS) from November 2009 to November 2019.  He is a cousin of former Croatian prime minister Jadranka Kosor.
Darinko Kosor was a president of League of Socialist Youth Zagreb.

References

External links
https://web.archive.org/web/20110928083154/http://www.zagreb.hr/default.aspx?id=71 

1965 births
Living people
Politicians from Zagreb
Croatian Social Liberal Party politicians
Representatives in the modern Croatian Parliament